Morelia is a town and municipality in Caquetá Department, Colombia.

See also
Municipalities of Colombia

External links
Morelia, Caqueta official website

Municipalities of Caquetá Department